The 1927 Cork Junior Hurling Championship was the 31st staging of the Cork Junior Hurling Championship since its establishment by the Cork County Board.

On 11 March 1928, Ballincollig won the championship following a 4–00 to 3–01 defeat of Kilbrittain in the final at Bandon Sportsfield. It was their first championship title.

References

Cork Junior Hurling Championship
Cork Junior Hurling Championship